The Water Club, a restaurant on Manhattan's East River
The Water Club, a hotel connected to the Borgata in Atlantic City